The Welsh Bowling Association (WBA) is the governing body for men's outdoor bowling clubs in Wales. It has 10 affiliated counties and 286 affiliated clubs. The WBA organise competitions, including the county championship, and select and manage the national side. At the 2009 Atlantic Rim Championship in Johannesburg, the Welsh men's team finished third.

The Welsh Bowling Association is based at Llanishen, Cardiff.

See also
Welsh Bowls Federation
Welsh Crown Green Bowling Association
Welsh Indoor Bowls Association
Welsh Ladies Indoor Bowling Association
Welsh Short Mat Bowls Association
Welsh Women’s Bowling Association

References

External links
Official website

Bowling
Bowls in Wales